Ng Ka Yeung (born 2 May 2001) is a Hong Kong professional footballer who currently plays as a winger for Hong Kong Premier League club Resources Capital.

Club career
In July 2019, Ng signed his first professional contract with Hong Kong Premier League club Happy Valley. 

On 9 August 2021, Ng joined Eastern. He left the club on 9 July 2022.

On 11 August 2022, Ng joined Resources Capital.

References

External links
 HKFA

2001 births
Living people
Hong Kong footballers
Association football midfielders
Association football wingers
Happy Valley AA players
Eastern Sports Club footballers
Resources Capital FC players
Hong Kong Premier League players